The Double Value Coupon Program, also known as DVCP, is one of three initiatives that are part of Wholesome Wave’s Nourishing Neighborhoods program.  The program aims to provide under-served communities with fresh fruits and vegetables by allowing consumers to double the value of federal nutrition benefits from Supplemental Nutrition Assistance Program (SNAP, formerly food stamps) and Women, Infant and Children (WIC) funding when used at participating farmers’ markets.

History
The Double Value Coupon Program was launched in 2008 at the Westport, CT  farmers market with seed money for the pilot program from the Betsy and Jesse Fink Foundation. In 2009, building from successful pilot programs in 2008 and with support from a number of foundations and donors, Wholesome Wave outreach expanded the DVCP program to ten states and the District of Columbia. As of 2012, the program has expanded to include 300 markets in 24 states and the District of Columbia and has reached over 40,000 participants.  Wholesome Wave partners with over 60 community-based non-profit organizations to bring these DVCP incentives to federal benefit recipients that can be redeemed towards fresh locally grown produce.

Mission and Goals
The goal of the Double Value Coupon Program is to provide access to produce for at-risk consumers, as 32 million Americans are currently living in food deserts.
The DVCP program is designed to feed the nation's hungry and to nourish vulnerable families, providing children with better nutrition, improved self-esteem, peace of mind, and food security.

The DVCP incentive program was established to service customer, vendor and neighborhood needs simultaneously while keeping federal nutrition benefit funds within regional and local communities.
 Customers get twice as much fresh produce, improving family health
 Vendors get  a new customer base and make more money per transaction
 Neighborhoods get more thriving markets that serve the broader community

References

External links 
 Wholesome Wave Organization
 Double Value Coupon Program

Federal assistance in the United States